Great Scott! is an American sitcom starring Tobey Maguire and  Kevin Connolly that premiered on Fox on September 27th, 1992, and aired from October 4th, 1992 until it was abruptly cancelled on November 29th of the same year. It was created by Tom Gammill and Max Pross, and produced by Castle Rock Entertainment and Claverly One Productions.

Great Scott! would come to serve as Maguire's first starring role in a TV series.

Premise
The show centered on 15-year-old Scott Melrod (Maguire), a freshman at Taft High School, and his vivid imagination.  
The main gimmick of the show is the audience experiencing Scott's imagination in different situations he is put in.
This is shown multiple times in all known episodes.

Cast
Tobey Maguire as Scott Melrod
Nancy Lenehan as Beverly Melrod
Ray Baker as Walter Melrod
Sarah Koskoff as Nina Melrod
Kevin Connolly as Larry O'Donnell
Vinessa Shaw as Carolyn

Episodes

Cancellation
Great Scott! was most likely cancelled due to its poor ratings, ranking 136th lowest rated out of 138 television shows that ran from 1992-1993. It was rated a 4.2, the highest on the list being rated a 21.9, and the lowest being a 4.0.
Despite its cancellation in the states, all 13 produced episodes are known to have aired on German Television station RTL Zwei, though the status of these German variants are unknown. The German version of Great Scott! is known as Super Scott!.

References

External links
 
 
 TV Guide
 An archive of the only aired episodes

1992 American television series debuts
1992 American television series endings
1990s American high school television series
1990s American single-camera sitcoms
1990s American teen sitcoms
Television series by Castle Rock Entertainment
English-language television shows
Fox Broadcasting Company original programming
Television series about families
Television series about teenagers